Sir Stephen Robert Bloom FRS (born 24 October 1942) is a British Professor of Medicine at Imperial College London where he leads the Diabetes, Endocrinology and Metabolism division.

Education
Bloom was educated at Queens' College, Cambridge, where he was awarded a Master of Arts degree in 1968 and a Doctor of Medicine degree in 1979. He received his Doctor of Science (DSc) degree from the University of London in 1982. Bloom completed appointments as a house officer, senior house officer and specialist registrar at Middlesex Hospital, University College London, where he also received his Medical Research Council (MRC) Clinical Research Fellowship training.

Awards and honours
Bloom was elected a Fellow of the Royal Society (FRS) in 2013. His nomination reads:  Blooms research has been funded by grants awarded by the BBSRC, the Medical Research Council (MRC) and the National Institute for Health Research (NIHR).

Bloom was also knighted in the Queen's 2012 New Year Honours, and awarded Fellowships of the Royal College of Physicians (FRCP), Royal College of Pathologists (FRCPath), the Academy of Medical Sciences (FMedSci) and the Royal Society of Biology (FRSB). Bloom is Chairman of a Biotechnology Company, Zihipp, which completed round A funding in January 2020.  It specialises in peptide hormone analogues to treat obesity and diabetes.

References

Living people
Fellows of the Royal Society
1942 births
Knights Bachelor
Fellows of the Royal Society of Biology
Alumni of Queens' College, Cambridge
NIHR Senior Investigators